The European Geography Association (EGEA) is an association encouraging European students to engage with geography through hands-on learning experiences. EGEA provides exchange programs and excursions to facilitate connection between European students and others from across the globe.

EGEA also provide publications in partnership with EuroGeography. They operate in 32 European nations and have over 3,000 active participants.

The aims of EGEA are to offer personal development opportunities to young geographers across Europe, and enable them to fulfill their potential as young scientists. EGEA provides complementary and alternative learning opportunities, beyond formal education of geography. This is done by encouraging and enabling involvement in intercultural interaction, as well as by development of academic, scientific, cultural and professional activities intended for young geographers on terms of equality, diversity and non-discrimination. EGEA actively contributes towards the promotion of geography through its network capabilities and through strategic partnerships, with the ultimate goal to strengthen geography’s place in members’ local communities.

History 

The EGEA was founded in 1987 by students from universities in three main cities; Barcelona, Warszawa and Utrecht. The aim for the organisation was to allow students from varying European countries to exchange knowledge regarding the geography of the region. One year later, in 1988, EGEA was officially registered as a foundation with chair in Utrecht. In 1996 the first website of EGEA was launched. The homepage would become the central meeting point for all EGEA members across Europe.At the 2009 General Assembly in Heeg a change of EGEA's legal status was decided. Since then EGEA is working as an association.
Until 2014 EGEA has grown from its initial three entities to a current number of 90 entities in 36 different countries.

Activities 

There are several local, national, and international activities organized by the entities of EGEA. The main events of the year are the congresses. Other annual events are national weekends and summer schools. In addition, entities organize their own events. The spectrum of content of these events reaches from scientific seminars or excursions to events where the main focus lies on getting together. A high popularity among EGEAns are exchanges between entities.

Congresses 

Five congresses take place each year: four Regional Congresses in Spring, organized by one or more entities in each region, and the Annual Congress held in September.

Congresses always include workshops, excursions, trainings, and lectures with a scientific background. There are also meetings for Contact Persons of the entities and regional or international assemblies.

Exchanges 
Students exchanges are the core activities of EGEA. They enable small groups from 2 or 3 EGEA entities to visit each other in their countries, learn about culture, explore local habits and experience that country's natural environment. Most importantly, they enable young geographers to get to know their international peers. Following the agreement, one entity is hosting the other one. During the hosting time young people take care of the accommodation, food, and programme. Later on, the hosting entity becomes the visiting one and repays the visit. Exchanges are numerously the most attended activities, when taking into consideration number of events taking place every year.

Scientific Symposium 
Each year at the Annual Congress there is also a scientific symposium, where the members are able to present their scientific work, for example diploma or PhD theses.

Seminars 
There are a few seminars every year, always organized by several entities. The seminars are held on a scientific level that cover different themes in the particular disciplines of geography.

Summer-/Winterschools 
During the semester breaks in summer and winter EGEA also gives students the chance to participate at self-organized summer- or winterschools.

Weekend Activities 
The national or international weekend activities are organized by the EGEA. In most cases there is a main theme to show particular regional or local characteristics. The programme can be scientific or have a more informal level. Some of the regional weekend activities, such as those in the Baltic states, the Slavic countries, Germany, the Benelux countries, the Iberian peninsula and the Balkans, are mainly aimed at people from that region, whereas other weekends are open to all EGEA members.

Structure 

EGEA is divided into four administrative regions: the North & Baltic, the Eastern, the Western and the Euro-Mediterranean regions. Every region elects a new Regional Contact Person each year. As helping hands they have one or more Regional Assistants. Together they form the Regional Teams. The function of Regional Contact Person was introduced in 2012 to relieve EGEA's board members of coordinating the regions.

Regions

North & Baltic Region 

This region is located in Northern Europe around the Baltic Sea. Entities that belong there are situated in: Denmark, Estonia, Finland, Iceland, Latvia, Lithuania, Norway, Russia and Sweden. The countries in this region that currently don't have active entities are Iceland and Latvia.

Eastern Region 

The Eastern Region is the largest geographic region in EGEA. Part of this region are the entities of Armenia, Azerbaijan, Belarus, Bulgaria, the Czech Republic, Georgia, Hungary, Moldova, Poland, Romania, Russia (except for Kaliningrad and Saint Petersburg), Slovakia and Ukraine. The countries in this region that currently don't have active entities are Armenia, Azerbaijan, Belarus, Bulgaria, Georgia and Moldova.

Western Region 

By members and entities the Western Region is the largest administrative region of EGEA. It comprises the British Isles, the Netherlands, Belgium, Luxembourg, Germany, Switzerland, Austria and parts of France. The country in this region that currently doesn't have an active entity is Luxembourg.

Euro-Mediterranean Region 

This region contains all entities of countries that are located around the Mediterranean Sea. There are entities in Bosnia and Herzegovina, Croatia, France, Italy, Malta, Montenegro, North Macedonia, Serbia, Slovenia, Spain and Turkey.

Board of EGEA 

The Board consists of six persons, four of whom fulfill the functions of president, vice-president, secretary and treasurer. These four board members are elected by the General Assembly out of members from the Association. A representative of the entity chosen to organize the Annual Congress was also a member of the board, but this latter position was replaced by an elected Public Relations and Event Advisor at the General Assembly of 2015.
The board represents and is the executive body of the Association. 
The board is supported by the Secretariat Director whose seat is the office at the EGEA Headquarters in Utrecht.
This position was first created in 2005 and contrived by the entity of Utrecht. In 2016 also the grant team with its coordinator was created to take care of financial grants.

)* until 2012 Annual Congress Organiser, then until 2015 Annual Congress Coordinator.
)** until 2016 Secreteriat Director

Regional Contact Persons 

The four regional contact persons maintain the contact between the entities in their respective regions and the European board.

Teams 

EGEA has several teams (previously committees), carrying out important work to keep the association up and running. Currently the following teams are active within EGEA:

Partners 

EGEA has several partnerships with organizations like EUROGEO, IAAS, ISHA,and Studyportals. Furthermore, there is a partnership to a program by the EU, "Youth in Action" as well as a partnership to a program by the Council of Europe, "European Youth Forum". There are also cooperations with ESRI, a supplier of GIS programs, and with the Utrecht University.

References

External links 

European student organizations
Geography organizations
International organizations based in Europe
Organizations established in 1987
1987 establishments in Europe